Matteo Cancellieri (born 12 February 2002) is an Italian professional footballer who plays as a winger for  club Lazio, on loan from Hellas Verona. He also represents the Italy national team.

Club career

Early career in Rome 
Matteo Cancellieri arrived in the AS Roma academy at the age of nine from Polisportiva De Rossi in the Appio-Latino, soon becoming a prolific goalscorer with the Giallorossi's youth setup.

Cancellieri first rose to fame on the 13 March 2018, during the Champions League game against Shakhtar Donetsk, where he was a ball boy at the Stadio Olimpico. He was pushed by the Shakhtar player Facundo Ferreyra, who made him fall beyond an advertising board. Roma eventually won the game, qualifying for the quarter-finals, where they would beat FC Barcelona in a famous remontada, under the management of coach Di Francesco.

Verona 
In 2020, he joined Hellas Verona on a two years loan, with an obligation of purchase, along with his teammates Mert Çetin and Aboudramane Diaby, as Marash Kumbulla made the move in the opposite direction to join Rome.

He played his first season with the club in the Campionato Primavera 2, still impressing with his goal tally, as he scored 15 goals and delivered 7 assists in only 18 games.

He made his professional debut for Verona under manager Eusebio Di Francesco on the 14 August 2021, starting the Coppa Italia game against Catanzaro, proving to be instrumental in his team 3–0 home win. Cancellieri made his Serie A debut only one week later against Sassuolo, coming on as a substitute, before starting his first Serie A game six days later, against Inter Milan, the reigning champions.

Loan to Lazio 
On 30 June 2022, Cancellieri moved on loan to Lazio. Lazio will be obligated to buy his rights if certain conditions are met.

International career 
Already an international with Italy's under-17 in 2018, Matteo Cancellieri was first called with the under-21 in August 2021. He made his debut on the 3rd September during the European Championship qualifying, starting the home game against Luxembourg.

He was selected in the senior Italy squad for the 2022 Finalissima against Argentina on 1 June 2022 and for 2022–23 UEFA Nations League group stage matches against Germany, Hungary, England and Germany between 4 and 14 June 2022.

References

External links

2002 births
Living people
Italian footballers
Italy youth international footballers
Association football forwards
Footballers from Rome
Hellas Verona F.C. players
S.S. Lazio players
Serie A players
Italian people of Cuban descent